The MV Agusta 750 S also known as the MV Agusta 750 Sport, was a motorcycle manufactured by the MV Agusta company from 1970 to 1975. Production total of this model series was 583 machines.

Development
The previous model, the MV Agusta 600, was designed as a touring machine but was not a great success. Its replacement, the 750 S, was designed as a sport bike, reflecting the racing heritage of the company. The four-cylinder engine had its capacity expanded to 750cc by increasing the bore, the exhaust system was upgraded and the seat, tank and handlebars were changed to more sporting items.

Technical data 
The core of the engine was formed by the crankcase rack. The crankshaft, cylinder and cylinder head assembly were mounted on it. The rack took the nine-piece crankshaft in six bearing blocks, as well as the spur gears in the control tower for the double camshaft drive. After loosening twelve nuts, the units mounted on the rack could be lifted out. Particularly striking was the fine ribbing of the cooling fins of the sump as well as the oversized cylinder head caused by the double camshaft drive. The transversely mounted cassette transmission was driven from the engine by helical gears. It was connected to the shaft drive to the rear wheel via a spiral bevel gear angle drive. The gear change was on the right side, the first gear was up, all other gears were engaged by a downwards push of the lever. In contrast to the previous 600 model, the 750 used a double sided, twin leading shoe drum brake on the front and a single leading shoe on the rear. The front brake was changed to hydraulic dual-discs in 1974.

Model Variants
Two model variants were available based on the MV Agusta 750 S:

 MV Agusta GT (1972–74): A reduced-power version ( @ 8450 rpm), which was available in white bronze with touring handlebars. A total of 33 of the GT model were made.
 MV Agusta SS (1971–75) (also known in Germany as MV Agusta SS Daytona): An uprated variant ( @ 9,900 rpm) with full fairing.

F750 S Imola
Two machines were modified to Formula 750 racing specification for Giacomo Agostini and Nello Pagani to ride in the 1972 Imola 200. Arturo Magni, head of the racing department, modified the engines to produce 85 bhp at 9000 rpm. A frame that Magni had designed for a possible new 750 road model was used. Many of the cycle parts from the 500 racers were used: Ceriani forks and brakes, Borrani rims etc., bringing the weight of the machine down to 190 kg.

Due to technical problems, Pagani did not start the race. Agostini got a good start and started to build a lead, but on lap 5 he was overtaken by Paul Smart on the works Ducati. On lap 40, Agostini retired with technical problems.

Exclusivity
Following Japanese domination of the motorcycle world market from around 1970, British and Italian motorcycle manufacturers began to run into financial difficulties. Their prices were relatively high, the manufactured quantities remained low and accordingly few motorcycle manufacturers survived in Europe. Contemporary MV Agusta 750 S and its follow-up models of this series have achieved high exclusitivity because of the low production levels and the racing achievements of MV Agusta. Most machines have been restored at enormous financial expense and remain mostly in collector's hands. When one of these rarities reaches the used vehicle market, very high prices are achieved.

References

Bibliography
 
 
 
 

750 S
Motorcycles introduced in 1970
Shaft drive motorcycles
Sport bikes